Live at the Fillmore Auditorium is a live album by the American musician Chuck Berry. He was backed by the Steve Miller Blues Band (which later became better known as the Steve Miller Band). Berry's second live album, it was released in 1967 by Mercury Records.

The album was re-released on CD by Rebound Records, with three additional tracks, "Good Morning Little Schoolgirl", "Reelin' and Rockin'" and "My Ding-a-Ling". Incorrectly marked as bonus tracks are "Feelin' It" and "It Hurts Me Too", both of which are on the original album. The Rebound reissue omits "Wee Baby Blues", which is on the original album. An earlier CD reissue by Mercury additionally includes "Bring Another Drink" and "Worried Life Blues".

Critical reception

Rolling Stone wrote that "the most interesting cuts are the instrumentals where Berry applies his rock guitar to Chicago blues and the Steve Miller Band comes into the foreground."

Track listing
All songs written by Chuck Berry except where noted

Medley: "Rockin' at the Fillmore" / "Every Day I Have the Blues" (Memphis Slim) (8:36)
"C.C. Rider" (Ma Rainey, Lena Arantt) (4:14)
"Driftin' Blues" (Charles Brown, Eddie Williams, Johnny Moore) (3:56)
"Feelin' It" (4:01)
"Flying Home" (Benny Goodman, Lionel Hampton, Sid Robin) (2:44)
"(I'm Your) Hoochie Coochie Man" (Willie Dixon) (5:54)
"It Hurts Me Too" (unknown) (4:47)
"Good Morning Little Schoolgirl" (Sonny Boy Williamson) (2:50)
"Fillmore Blues" (3:29)
"Wee Baby Blues" (Joe Turner, Pete Johnson) (4:06)
"Bring Another Drink" (2:22)
"Worried Life Blues" (3:47)
"Reelin' and Rockin'" (5:57)
"My Ding-a-Ling" (4:36)
"Johnny B. Goode" (3:14)

Personnel
Chuck Berry – guitar, vocals
The Steve Miller Blues Band
Tim Davis – drums
Steve Miller – guitar, harmonica; vocals on "It Hurts Me Too"
Jim "Curley" Cooke - guitar
Jim Peterman – keyboards
Lonnie Turner – bass guitar
Technical
Bill Halverson – engineer
Wally Heider – recording
Erik Weber – photography

References

Chuck Berry live albums
1967 live albums
Mercury Records live albums
Albums recorded at the Fillmore